The 2014 Oman Super Cup was the 12th edition of the Oman Super Cup, an annual football match between Al-Nahda Club the champions of the 2013–14 Oman Professional League and Fanja SC, the winners of the 2013–14 Sultan Qaboos Cup. The match was played at the Sohar Regional Sports Complex in Sohar, Oman.

Match details

References

External links
2014 Oman Super Cup - SOCCERWAY
2014 Oman Super Cup - Goalzz.com
2014 Oman Super Cup - ofa.om
2014 Oman Super Cup - YouTube
2014 Oman Super Cup - YouTube
النهضة وفنجاء يبحثان عن أول ألقاب الموسم الكروي - alwatan.com

Oman Super Cup seasons
Cup
Oman